Amphipneustes is a genus of echinoderms belonging to the family Schizasteridae.

The species of this genus are found at the coasts of Antarctica.

Species:

Amphipneustes bifidus 
Amphipneustes brevisternalis 
Amphipneustes davidi 
Amphipneustes koehleri 
Amphipneustes lorioli 
Amphipneustes marsupialis 
Amphipneustes mironovi 
Amphipneustes rostratus 
Amphipneustes similis 
Amphipneustes tumescens

References

Schizasteridae
Amphipneustes
Echinoidea genera